Beit Dajan is a Palestinian village in the Nablus Governorate in the north central West Bank, located  east of Nablus. According to the Palestinian Central Bureau of Statistics, it had a population of approximately 3,589 in mid-year 2006.

Location
Beit Dajan is  located east of Nablus. It is bordered by Furush Beit Dajan to the east, Al ‘Aqrabaniya to the north, Deir al Hatab and Salim to the west, and Beit Furik to the south.

History
Pottery sherds from Iron Age I (12-11th centuries BCE), Iron Age II, Hellenistic, Roman, Byzantine eras have been found here.

It has been suggested that this was the place named Dagon, inhabited by Samaritans in the 7th century CE.

According to Tsvi Misinai, male circumcision is performed on the seventh day of birth, following the Jewish and Samaritan traditions, rather than the Muslim custom.

Sherds from the Crusader/Ayyubid periods have also been found here.

Ottoman era
In 1517,   Beit Dajan  was incorporated into the Ottoman Empire with the rest of  Palestine. In 1596, it  appeared in  Ottoman tax registers as being in the Nahiya of Jabal Qubal, part of the Sanjak of Nablus.  It had a population of 53 households,  all Muslim. The villagers  paid  a fixed tax-rate of 33,3 % on agricultural products, including wheat, barley, summer crops, olives, and goats or beehives, and for a press for olives or grapes; a total of 10,292 akçe. All of the revenue went to a waqf. Pottery sherds from the early Ottoman era have also been found here.

In 1838, Beit Dejan was noted in the El-Beitawy district, east of Nablus.

In 1850-51 it was called a "considerable" village, while in 1870, Victor Guérin found it to have 400 inhabitants. Guérin also noted a small and  ancient mosque, and a number of cisterns hollowed out of rock, which still  served the needs of the villagers.

In 1882, the PEF's Survey of Western Palestine described Beit Dajan as:  "A small village, evidently an ancient site, with rock-cut tombs and wells to the east. It stands at the eastern end of the plain which runs below Salim. This place, like Azmut, is surrounded with olive-trees." They further noted:  "The ruin on the east is a watch-tower, apparently ancient; near the village are cisterns and heaps of stones, and rock-cut tombs."

British Mandate era
In the  1922 census of Palestine conducted by the British Mandate authorities, Bait Dajan had a population of 487; all Muslims, increasing slightly  in the 1931 census to 548 Muslims, in a total of 118 houses.

In  the 1945 statistics, the population (including Beit Dajan Jiflik and Khirbat Furush) was 750, all Muslims, with a total of 44,076 dunams of land, according to an official land and population survey. Of this, 6 dunams were for citrus and bananas, 2,789 for plantations or irrigated land, 17,625 for cereals, while 48 dunams were built-up land.

Jordanian era
In the wake of the 1948 Arab–Israeli War Beit Dajan came  under Jordanian rule.

The Jordanian census of 1961 found 926 inhabitants in Beit Dajan.

1967 and aftermath
Since the Six-Day War in 1967, Beit Dajan came under Israeli occupation.

After the 1995 accords, 38% of the village land is defined as being in Area B, while the remaining 62%  is Area C.

Israel has confiscated 199 dunams of village land for two Israeli settlements; Hamra and Mekhora.

In March, 2021, a local imam, Atef Hanaisheh, was shot in the head and killed by the Israeli military. The killing occurred during a protest in the village against a nearby Israeli unauthorized settler outpost.

References

Bibliography

 
  
 (p. 847)

External links
 Welcome to Bayt Dajan
Beit Dajan, Welcome to Palestine
Survey of Western Palestine, Map 12:  IAA, Wikimedia commons
Beit Dajan village profile, Applied Research Institute–Jerusalem, ARIJ
Beit Dajan, aerial photo, ARIJ
Beit Dajan
 Beit Dajan

Nablus Governorate
Villages in the West Bank
Municipalities of the State of Palestine
Ancient Samaritan settlements